Kavir Rural District is a rural district (dehestan) in Deyhuk District, Tabas County, South Khorasan Province, Iran. At the 2006 census, its population was 3,507, in 1,011 families.  The rural district has 21 villages.

References 

Rural Districts of South Khorasan Province
Tabas County